Paucar del Sara Sara Province is a province located in the south-eastern corner of the Ayacucho Region of Peru. It is one of eleven provinces that make up the region. The province has a population of 10,610 inhabitants 2005 census. It is bounded to the north and west by the Parinacochas Province and to the south and east by the Arequipa Region. The capital of this province is the city of Pausa.

Geography 
Other mountains are listed below:

Political division
The districts, with their capitals in parenthesis, are:

 Colta (Colta
 Corculla (Corculla)
 Lampa (Lampa)
 Marcabamba (Marcabamba)
 Oyolo (Oyolo)
 Pararca (Pararca)
 Pausa (Pausa)
 San Javier de Alpabamba (San Javier de Alpabamba)
 San José de Ushua (San José de Ushua)
 Sara Sara District (Qilcata)

Ethnic groups 
The people in the province are mainly indigenous citizens of Quechua descent. Quechua is the language which the majority of the population (50.15%) learned to speak in childhood, 49.36 % of the residents started speaking using the Spanish language (2007 Peru Census).

See also
 Ccotapampa
 Hatun Tipiqucha
 Huch'uy Tipiqucha
 Kunturqucha

Sources 

Provinces of the Ayacucho Region